Perumytilus is a monotypic genus of bivalves belonging to the family Mytilidae. The only species is Perumytilus purpuratus.

The species is found in Southern America.

References

Mytilidae
Bivalve genera
Monotypic mollusc genera